Larry Keating is the former athletic director for Seton Hall University; a position he held from 1985 to 1997.  Under his tenure at Seton Hall the Seton Hall Pirates men's basketball team advanced to the championship game of the 1989 NCAA Division I Men's Final Four.  He resigned from his position at Seton Hall in 1997 after refusing to fire the men's basketball coach, George Blaney. He is currently the special assistant to the athletics director at the University of Kansas, where he is in charge of scheduling basketball and football games.

Career 
He graduated from Stonehill College, in 1966, where he was a member of the men's basketball team. His first coaching job was at Stonehill College. After serving for a coach at Stonehill College, he was an assistant coach for the Hofstra University men's basketball team. From 1979 to 1985, he was the athletic director at Adelphi University. From 1985 to 1997, he was the athletic director at Seton Hall University. From 1997 to 1999, he was the president and general manager of the Trenton Shooting Stars basketball team. From 1999 to 2001, he worked as an administrator for the IBL. From 2001 to 2003, he served as Assistant Commissioner for Basketball/Football Operations for the Metro Atlantic Athletic Conference (MAAC).

References

Year of birth missing (living people)
Living people
Adelphi Panthers athletic directors
Hofstra Pride men's basketball coaches
Seton Hall Pirates athletic directors
Stonehill Skyhawks men's basketball coaches
Stonehill Skyhawks men's basketball players